The Walkway over the Hudson (also known as the Poughkeepsie Bridge, Poughkeepsie Railroad Bridge, Poughkeepsie–Highland Railroad Bridge, and High Bridge) is a steel cantilever bridge spanning the Hudson River between Poughkeepsie, New York, on the east bank and Highland, New York, on the west bank. Built as a double track railroad bridge, it was completed on January 1, 1889, and formed part of the Maybrook Railroad Line of the New York, New Haven and Hartford Railroad.

It was taken out of service on May 8, 1974, after it was damaged by fire. It was listed on the National Register of Historic Places in 1979, and its entry updated in 2008. The bridge was designated as a National Historic Civil Engineering Landmark by the American Society of Civil Engineers in 2009.

It was reopened on October 3, 2009, as a pedestrian walkway as part of the new Walkway Over the Hudson State Historic Park. The New York State Bridge Authority owns and is charged with maintaining the bridge structure (as directed by the Governor and Legislature in July 2010). The park is operated by the New York State Office of Parks, Recreation and Historic Preservation. In 2017, the walkway hosted 593,868 visitors. The park connects the Hudson Valley Rail Trail in Highland to the Dutchess Rail Trail, and forms part of the Empire State Trail.

At a length of 6,768 ft, it was the world's longest pedestrian footbridge from its opening until October 2016 when it became the second longest after being surpassed by the 7,974 ft Mile Into the Wild Walkway.

History

Construction
In 1868, an engineer proposed a railroad bridge across the Hudson River at Poughkeepsie, in a letter published in the Poughkeepsie Eagle newspaper. The proposal seemed so absurd that the Eagle ridiculed it, and it was effectively forgotten for a few years.

Over the years, many plans had been made for a fixed span across the Hudson River south of Albany to replace numerous car float and ferry operations. One of the most persistent was originally chartered in 1868 as the Hudson Highland Suspension Bridge Company, whose proposed bridge would have crossed from Anthony's Nose to Fort Clinton, now roughly the site of the Bear Mountain Bridge. It was never built.

The State of New York chartered the Poughkeepsie Bridge Company in 1872 with the support of Harvey G. Eastman, Mayor of Poughkeepsie and a member of the New York State Assembly. Eastman had met Andrew Carnegie, principal owner of the Keystone Bridge Company of Pittsburgh and previously a manager at the Pennsylvania Railroad (PRR). J. Edgar Thomson, President of the PRR, was persuaded to provide financial support, and Keystone became the contractor for the initial attempt to build a bridge at Poughkeepsie. Keystone prepared a four pier bridge design, but the Panic of 1873 killed financial support for project.

In 1875 Eastman and his colleagues made a second attempt at a bridge project, developing an agreement with the American Bridge Company of Chicago (founded 1870). American Bridge developed a plan and confronted the challenge of building the support piers in deep water. Pier construction began in 1876, but the contractors encountered the failure of a pier foundation and related construction difficulties in 1877. By early 1878 the company was bankrupt, and Eastman died later that year. It took several more years to find new investors for the project.

In 1886, the Manhattan Bridge Building Company was organized to finance the construction. Among the prominent backers was Henry Clay Frick, the coal tycoon and associate of Carnegie. The Union Bridge Company of Athens, Pennsylvania, which had completed the Michigan Central cantilever bridge at Niagara (see Niagara Cantilever Bridge), was subcontracted to build the Poughkeepsie Bridge. Dawson, Symmes and Usher were the foundation engineers, while John F. O'Rourke, P. P. Dickinson and Arthur B. Paine were the structural engineers. The bridge was designed by Charles Macdonald and Arthur B. Paine. As is typical for cantilever bridges, construction was carried out by constructing cribwork, masonry piers, towers, fixed truss sections on falsework, and finally cantilever sections, with the final cantilever interconnection (suspended) spans floated out or raised with falsework. The first train crossed the bridge on December 29, 1888, and it was formally opened for scheduled passenger service on January 1, 1889.

Considered an engineering marvel of the day, the bridge has seven main spans. All seven spans were built of newly available Bessemer process "mild" (between 0.16% and 0.29% carbon) steel, while the two approach viaducts were built of iron. It formed part of the most direct rail route between the industrial northeastern states and the midwestern and western states.

Operation

The bridge was the only fixed Hudson River crossing between Albany and New York City until the construction of the Bear Mountain (road) Bridge in 1924, and was advertised as a way to avoid New York City car floats and railroad passenger ferries. Ownership of the bridge passed through several railroads including the Central New England Railway (CNE), New York, New Haven & Hartford Railroad (NH), Penn Central (PC) and Conrail.

A strengthening of the bridge was completed in 1907 to handle heavier freight trains by engineer Ralph Modjeski, of the famed bridge civil engineering firm Modjeski and Masters, who added a third line of trusses down the middle, a central girder, and interleaved columns. In 1917–18, the double tracks on the bridge were converted to gauntlet track operation to center the weight of heavier New Haven Railroad 2-10-2 steam locomotives. Even so, trains were restricted to 12 miles per hour.  In 1959, the gauntlet tracks were replaced by a centered single track.

During World War II, the bridge was a vital link for war freight traffic, guarded around the clock by United States Army soldiers. At its peak, nearly 3,500 train cars crossed over the Hudson on a daily basis.

Decline
Traffic across the bridge began a slow decline in the 1950s as industry shrank in New England and with it the need for the raw materials railroads excelled at transporting. Traffic from the connecting New York, Ontario & Western ceased when that railroad shut down on March 30, 1957. Another connection, the coal-, slate-, and cement-hauling Lehigh & New England, shut down in 1961. At the same time, some new traffic began crossing the bridge, such as the New Haven's "Super Jet", one of the first trains to carry truck trailers. The Penn Central's acquisition of the New Haven in 1969 discouraged connecting traffic with the Erie Lackawanna, which competed with other Penn Central routes. After 1971, only one through train in each direction, for Erie Lackawanna, crossed the bridge.

While the Penn Central did not connect with the old New Haven on the west side of the bridge, it came close. For a short time in 1969 and 1970, Penn Central ran a daily train between Cedar Hill Yard in New Haven, Connecticut and Potomac Yard in Alexandria, Virginia, by way of the Lehigh and Hudson River Railway, which connected with the Penn Central Belvidere Division in Belvidere, New Jersey, 72 miles south of the old interchange with the New Haven at Maybrook Yard in Maybrook, New York. The service ended in a dispute over haulage charges and the traffic was diverted to the longer all-Penn Central route through Selkirk, New York. Ironically, the only reason the Lehigh and Hudson River was not part of the Penn Central was because a Penn Central predecessor, the Pennsylvania Railroad, had prevented the New Haven from acquiring it in 1905. The Lehigh and Hudson River and Erie Lackawanna were finally joined with the Penn Central when all were taken over by Conrail in 1976.

It was likely started by a spark from an eastbound Penn Central freight train that had just crossed the span. The Penn Central had neglected the bridge's fire-protection system, which had no water on the day of the fire, and had laid off employees who kept watch for such fires. A photograph of the last train, a run-through from the Erie Lackawanna, was included in a 40th anniversary web feature by the Poughkeepsie Journal.

In August 1974, the Penn Central applied for $1.75 million to repair and improve the bridge from the federal government through the Regional Rail Reorganization Act of 1973. By 1975, efforts had shifted to acquiring a combination of state and railroad funding. In November 1975, a formal agreement between the New York State Department of Transportation and the trustees of the Penn Central was approved, allowing the $359,000 insurance payout for the bridge to be spent on repairs, with the state paying the rest. In December, U.S. Representative Benjamin A. Gilman announced that $486,000 appropriated by the state legislature for repairs was undergoing final review by the state. Authorization for the state to spend its share on bridge repairs had still not been given when, on April 1, 1976, ownership of the bridge changed with the inception of Conrail. Having been forced to include the route over the bridge (the Maybrook Line) in its new system at the behest of Connecticut Senator Abraham Ribicoff, Conrail announced that it would not promise to repair and use the bridge despite a Connecticut foundation's offer to pay half the repair cost if the bridge were used again. The railroad further said that other work required to make the entire Maybrook route usable would raise the reactivation cost to $45.8 million.

Seven years passed; pieces of the bridge's eastern approach viaduct over Poughkeepsie began falling onto U.S. Route 9 below, damaging passing vehicles. In response, the city sued Conrail and forced it to spend $300,000 in 1983 to remove the decking over the superstructure. Conrail then sought to dispose of the unused bridge and eventually abandoned and tore up the Maybrook Line between Hopewell Junction and Maybrook, New York in 1983–1984.

Railway Management Associates (1984–1998)
Conrail made initial plans to sell the bridge to bridge enthusiast and lawyer Donald L. Pevsner, by an option granted to him on February 1, 1984. Conrail and Central Hudson Gas and Electric were involved with negotiations regarding Central Hudson's two electrical circuits traversing the bridge. The New York State Supreme Court endorsed an agreement in September 1984 whereby Conrail would make every attempt to obtain the permits by May 1985 to demolish the bridge, and Central Hudson would make every attempt to find an alternative route for its circuits by May 1985. Conrail knew that there was lead paint on the bridge, permits for demolition might be difficult to obtain, and demolition costs would be high. Later in 1984, Conrail advised Pevsner to take title of the bridge in a shell corporation, with no assets but the bridge and no funds to pay for necessary insurance and maintenance: the railroad just wanted to be rid of the bridge, whatever the ethics of such disposal. This decision was made personally by then-Conrail Chairman L. Stanley Crane, at a time when Conrail was owned by the U.S. government. Pevsner refused, and let his option expire on November 1, 1984.   One day later, on November 2, 1984, Conrail sold the bridge for $1 to a group of investors from St. Davids, Pennsylvania called Railway Management Associates to "get it off the books". The only known member of this investor group was a convicted bank swindler and ex-felon named Gordon Schreiber Miller. For less than a year, Miller collected $10,000 in monthly rent paid by Central Hudson Gas & Electric Corporation for its two 115,000-volt and 69,000-volt circuits representing six power cables across the Hudson, attached to the south side of the bridge since 1949. Central Hudson de-energized those power lines and relocated them under the river by early 1985, thereby ending Miller's only source of bridge income. For the next fourteen years, Miller and his successor, Vito Moreno, spent little to nothing on maintenance or insurance; critical bridge navigation lights were mostly inoperative, resulting in large U.S. Coast Guard fines against the Miller corporation that all went unpaid. Further, all of the 2,200-pound brackets that connected Central Hudson's de-energized high-tension power lines to the south side of the bridge continued to deteriorate by rusting. Though Central Hudson admitted that it normally had a legal duty to remove its abandoned power lines, it refused to remove its abandoned bridge-affixed lines, instead relying on a claim that it no longer owned the lines at issue pursuant to prior litigation with Conrail that was decided on September 26, 1984, and won a similar legal opinion before the New York State Public Service Commission in 1995, which was left to stand on April 1, 1999 when The Poughkeepsie-Highland Railroad Bridge Company, Inc., as the successor owner to Gordon Schreiber Miller and Vito Moreno, withdrew its 1998 complaint against Central Hudson on January 27, 1999.

Restoration

On June 4, 1998, following the long nonpayment of Dutchess and Ulster County taxes on the bridge by prior owners Gordon Schreiber Miller and his successor, Vito Moreno, Moreno deeded the bridge to a nonprofit volunteer organization called Walkway Over the Hudson, which took title through its nonprofit New York corporation, the Poughkeepsie-Highland Railroad Bridge Company, Inc., hoping to turn it into a pedestrian and cyclist walkway. The deed was recorded in both counties on June 5, 1998. The former Central Hudson power lines were finally removed in 2009, as part of Walkway construction. On December 21, 2010, the Walkway corporation conveyed the entire structure to the New York State Bridge Authority, which restored high-limit liability insurance and "deep-pocket" maintenance assurance for the first time since November 2, 1984. On September 5, 2009, conversion work and repairs to the structural steel and the laying of concrete slabs for the walkway were completed. The volunteer head of "Walkway", as it is known locally, said in 2008, "We think people will come from all over. It's the equivalent of the Eiffel Tower, or the Golden Gate Bridge." The project initially received support from local residents, city and state officials totaling about $1,000,000, plus forgiveness of $550,000 in taxes inherited from the previous owners. Walkway then solicited funding from both the State and Federal governments for historic preservation, and from private philanthropic organizations. Funding sources as of January 13, 2016, include:

 The Dyson Foundation, which has donated almost $20 million, including guaranteeing $8.1 million in loans that were made by Ulster Savings Bank and M&T Bank to complete the project in 2009 (now paid-off), plus $2.3 million to build the elevator that was completed in 2014. 
 New York State funding, from various entities, totals about $22.5 million.
 Federal government funding, from various entities, totals about $3.5 million.
 Scenic Hudson, Inc., which has donated $1 million.
 The Jane W. Nuhn Charitable Trust has donated $500,000.
 The M&T Charitable Foundation has donated between $50,000 and $100,000.
 Amy P. Goldman and Sarah Arno have donated between $100,000 and $250,000.

The total budget as of October 2009 totaled about $38.8 million.  The Walkway Group raised a total of $30.7 million as of October 23, 2009. The $8.1 million deficit was financed by lines of credit from Ulster Savings Bank ($4 million) and M&T Bank ($4.1 million) that were drawn-upon to complete the project in 2009.  These lines of credit were converted to loans, with an additional $2.3 million allocated to 2014 elevator construction, and were guaranteed and paid-off by The Dyson Foundation (see above).

The project was separated into four phases, with the first two completed as of October 2009:

 Phase 1 – attain ownership of the bridge.
 Phase 2 – structural analysis of the bridge and creation of a comprehensive plan, including budget and timeline for completion. The group also had to find funding for the project and secure funding for the start of construction.
 Phase 3 – construct and open the first  of the walkway on the Ulster side. This phase was complete on October 3, 2009 (the grand-opening date), excepting a $2.3 million elevator installation in Poughkeepsie that was completed during the summer of 2014.
 Phase 4 – construct and open the remaining  of the walkway and its resultant connections to the Hudson Valley Rail Trail in Highland and the Dutchess Rail Trail in Poughkeepsie. The walkway was completed on September 5, 2009, and opened to the public on October 3, 2009. The Hudson Valley Rail Trail connection was finished in the autumn of 2010. The Dutchess Rail Trail connection has also been completed.

The piers were inspected in 2008 and given a clean bill of health. Similarly, Bergmann Associates, P.C. (of Rochester and Albany, New York), project engineers and managers, has stated in writing that the wind loads were carefully examined for the replacement, solid-concrete Walkway decking, and that this item is not a safety problem. The decking work was completed on September 5, 2009.  Walkway opened the bridge to the public on October 3, 2009, in time for the quadricentennial celebration of Henry Hudson sailing up the Hudson River, and that day handed it over to the New York State Office of Parks, Recreation and Historic Preservation for management. Despite this, inevitable comparisons have been drawn to the similar Kinzua Bridge, in northwestern Pennsylvania, which blew over in a microburst tornado when the bolts connecting the steel framework to the piers failed. Ironically, renovation work was going on to strengthen the corroded areas when the tornado destroyed most of this former Erie Railroad viaduct. During Hurricane Irene, residents living within 500 feet of the Poughkeepsie Bridge were evacuated as a precaution, and emergency repairs to reduce bridge sway (by the addition of new steel X-braces, supplanting the original turnbuckle-adjusted tension rods) were hurriedly installed.

The bridge became a National Recreation Trail in 2009.

Walkway over the Hudson State Historic Park

The opening ceremony of the Walkway Over the Hudson State Historic Park was held on October 3, 2009, as part of wider NY400 celebrations, featured music by Pete Seeger, and was attended by Governor David Paterson, Senator Chuck Schumer, Congressman Maurice Hinchey, president of nearby Vassar College Catharine Bond Hill, John May, engineer of the last train across the bridge, and other officials.  Paterson said, "This bridge is now the longest footbridge in the world."

The walkway immediately saw many more visitors than the expected 267,000 per year. In its first three months, it saw about 415,000 people.

The walkway is operated as part of the New York State Historic Park System, open from 7:00 a.m. to dusk. Limited, wheelchair-friendly parking is available on either end of the bridge:
 East end:  61 Parker Avenue, city of Poughkeepsie; charges $5 fee to park
 West end: 87 Haviland Road, Highland

There are restrooms located at the ends of the walkway, although at the time of a 2008 engineering survey of the bridge, there was "not a johnny on the spot." Pets are permitted, but owners should bring equipment to clean up. Bicycles and roller blades (but not skateboards) are permitted, and the walkway is flat and relatively wheelchair-friendly.

The walkway connects with the Dutchess Rail Trail on the Poughkeepsie side and the Hudson Valley Rail Trail on the Highland side. The Dutchess Rail Trail additionally connects with the Maybrook Trailway in Hopewell Junction, making it part of a 40-mile continuous trail stretching from the village of Brewster to the village of New Paltz. All of these trails are part of the Empire State Trail.

New additions
On May 22, 2013, the Walkway Over the Hudson organization opened a new east pavilion, built entirely through donations of money and services.  The pavilion will be occupied by the volunteers who serve as walkway ambassadors who greet and offer assistance to visitors.

In October 2013, a "mobile web tour" was introduced, consisting of QR codes at locations on the walkway which link to Web content related to the spot.

In summer 2014, an elevator connecting Upper Landing Park to the walkway was opened.  This allows visitors to reach the center of the span via a more direct route.  It also connects the walkway to the Poughkeepsie waterfront area, which is near the railroad station, Mid-Hudson Children's Museum, and Waryas Park.

On June 29, 2018, the $5.4 million, 3,500-square-foot Ulster Welcome Center at the western gateway officially opened. The facility has a plaza and amphitheater, 1,400 square foot covered patio and concession stand and public restrooms. On June 20, 2019, the $3 million Dutchess Welcome Center at the eastern end of the park was dedicated and opened to the public. The 1,800 square-foot facility features restrooms, bike racks, tourist information, an outdoor patio with benches and a water fountain for dogs. Dual entrances are off Washington Street and Orchard Place. A new glassed-in elevator, opened on June 20, 2019, that takes visitors to the Walkway from Upper Landing Park has been rebuilt with new "energy chain" technology which will make operations more reliable.

On October 25, 2021, Governor Kathy Hochul dedicated the new East Gate Plaza for the Walkway Over The Hudson. The location, outside the Poughkeepsie entrance, doubled the gathering space on top of the Washington Street stairs. The space is suitable for community and other events. The project cost $2 million and was funded through State Parks Capital Funds, the Environmental Protection Fund and support from the Friends of the Walkway.

Events and incidents
The first footrace on the walkway occurred the day after the official opening on October 4, 2009. The 5k race started on the Highland side, crossed to the Poughkeepsie side and turned around at the parking lot and finished back in Highland. The race was won by James Boeding in a time of 16:26. The female winner was Kira DiCaprio in 20:12. There were 660 recorded finishers of the race. The 5K race, called "Treetops to Rooftops," has become an annual event, organized by the Mid-Hudson Road Runners Club. The inaugural Walkway Marathon was held on June 13, 2015, with full and half marathons and a 5K run. A new addition in 2016 was the Think Differently Dash, a one-mile race for people with physical and developmental disabilities.

On May 15, 2010, LEDs were turned on for the first time, designed to allow nighttime use of the bridge, though due to funding limitations this is expected to only be used on special occasions. Some 3,000 people paid $5 apiece to attend the sold-out ceremony.  Crowd management presented a problem, prompting criticism and an apology from walkway organizational leaders, but ultimately no incident or injury.

Though typically closed at sunset each day, the walkway often has events after sundown.  Some of these openings (such as for Independence Day and in December) include fireworks displays.  In July 2012, in a photograph taken from the walkway, an amateur photographer captured what the New York Daily News described as a "breathtaking juxtaposition" capturing fireworks and a bolt of lightning in the same image.  Some of the nighttime events have featured members of the Mid-Hudson Astronomical Association, who have provided telescopes for public viewing of the moon, stars, and planets from the walkway, along with lectures by local astronomer Bob Berman.

On January 21, 2017, a march was held there as part of the worldwide 2017 Women's March the day after the inauguration of Donald Trump as president, drawing an estimated 5,000 participants, extending the entire length of the walkway.

See also

Poughkeepsie Bridge Route
Mount Carmel District
List of bridges documented by the Historic American Engineering Record in New York
List of fixed crossings of the Hudson River

References

External links

Walkway Over the Hudson organization
New York State Walkway Over the Hudson State Historic Park
Background information
Bridging the Hudson at Poughkeepsie 1871 Bridge Prospectus
The Poughkeepsie Bridge — From Beginning to End | Catskill Archive
Project Write: Documenting the Walkway (documentary video)
Poughkeepsie Journal interactive feature on history of railroad bridge and its 1974 fire
Illustrations and images

Walkway.org History section, has pictures of falsework and cantilever cranes.
Preservation efforts and historic register information
Bridgeweb.com article on historic cantilevers and preservation efforts
National Register of Historic Places nomination 1978 Announcement

Railroad bridges in New York (state)
Bridges over the Hudson River
Cantilever bridges in the United States
Truss bridges in the United States
Railroad bridges on the National Register of Historic Places in New York (state)
Buildings and structures in Poughkeepsie, New York
Bridges in Ulster County, New York
Bridges completed in 1889
Historic American Engineering Record in New York (state)
Rail trails in New York (state)
Rail trail bridges in the United States
Historic Civil Engineering Landmarks
State parks of New York (state)
Parks in Ulster County, New York
Pedestrian bridges in New York (state)
Hudson River Valley National Heritage Area
Former railway bridges in the United States
Tourist attractions in Poughkeepsie, New York
1889 establishments in New York (state)
National Register of Historic Places in Poughkeepsie, New York
Viaducts in the United States
Steel bridges in the United States
New York State Bridge Authority